Ko-iwa Rock is a small rock exposure  west of Oku-iwa Glacier on the coast of Queen Maud Land, Antarctica. It was mapped from surveys and air photos by the Japanese Antarctic Research Expedition, 1957–62, and given the name "Ko-iwa", which means "small rock" in Japanese.

References

Rock formations of Queen Maud Land
Prince Olav Coast